Salgale Parish (known until 2011 as Sidrabene Parish) is an administrative unit of Jelgava Municipality in the Semigallia region of Latvia.

Villages of Salgale parish 
 Auči
 Emburga (parish centre)
 Garoza
 Ozolkalni
 Plāņi
 Purviņi
 Renceles

Jelgava Municipality
Parishes of Latvia
Semigallia